Cytokines are a broad and loose category of small proteins (~5–25 kDa) important in cell signaling. Cytokines are peptides and cannot cross the lipid bilayer of cells to enter the cytoplasm. Cytokines have been shown to be involved in autocrine, paracrine and endocrine signaling as immunomodulating agents. 

Cytokines include chemokines, interferons, interleukins, lymphokines, and tumour necrosis factors, but generally not hormones or growth factors (despite some overlap in the terminology). Cytokines are produced by a broad range of cells, including immune cells like macrophages, B lymphocytes, T lymphocytes and mast cells, as well as endothelial cells, fibroblasts, and various stromal cells; a given cytokine may be produced by more than one type of cell. They act through cell surface receptors and are especially important in the immune system; cytokines modulate the balance between humoral and cell-based immune responses, and they regulate the maturation, growth, and responsiveness of particular cell populations. Some cytokines enhance or inhibit the action of other cytokines in complex ways. They are different from hormones, which are also important cell signaling molecules. Hormones circulate in higher concentrations, and tend to be made by specific kinds of cells. Cytokines are important in health and disease, specifically in host immune responses to infection, inflammation, trauma, sepsis, cancer, and reproduction.

The word comes from the ancient Greek language: cyto, from Greek κύτος, kytos, 'cavity, cell' + kines, from Greek κίνησις, kinēsis, 'movement'.

Discovery 

Interferon-alpha, an interferon type I, was identified in 1957 as a protein that interfered with viral replication. The activity of interferon-gamma (the sole member of the interferon type II class) was described in 1965; this was the first identified lymphocyte-derived mediator. Macrophage migration inhibitory factor (MIF) was identified simultaneously in 1966 by John David and Barry Bloom.

In 1969, Dudley Dumonde proposed the term "lymphokine" to describe proteins secreted from lymphocytes and later, proteins derived from macrophages and monocytes in culture were called "monokines". In 1974, pathologist Stanley Cohen, M.D. (not to be confused with the Nobel laureate) published an article describing the production of MIF in virus-infected allantoic membrane and kidney cells, showing its production is not limited to immune cells. This led to his proposal of the term cytokine. Ogawa described the early acting growth factors, intermediate acting growth factors and late acting growth factors.

Difference from hormones
Classic hormones circulate in aqueous solution in nanomolar (10 M) concentrations that usually vary by less than one order of magnitude. In contrast, some cytokines (such as IL-6) circulate in picomolar (10 M) concentrations that can increase up to 1,000 times during trauma or infection. The widespread distribution of cellular sources for cytokines may be a feature that differentiates them from hormones. Virtually all nucleated cells, but especially endo/epithelial cells and resident macrophages (many near the interface with the external environment) are potent producers of IL-1, IL-6, and TNF-α. In contrast, classic hormones, such as insulin, are secreted from discrete glands such as the pancreas. The current terminology refers to cytokines as immunomodulating agents.

A contributing factor to the difficulty of distinguishing cytokines from hormones is that some immunomodulating effects of cytokines are systemic (i.e., affecting the whole organism) rather than local. For instance, to accurately utilize hormone terminology, cytokines may be autocrine or paracrine in nature, and chemotaxis, chemokinesis and endocrine as a pyrogen. Essentially, cytokines are not limited to their immunomodulatory status as molecules.

Nomenclature 
Cytokines have been classed as lymphokines, interleukins, and chemokines, based on their presumed function, cell of secretion, or target of action. Because cytokines are characterised by considerable redundancy and pleiotropism, such distinctions, allowing for exceptions, are obsolete.

 The term interleukin was initially used by researchers for those cytokines whose presumed targets are principally white blood cells (leukocytes). It is now used largely for designation of newer cytokine molecules and bears little relation to their presumed function. The vast majority of these are produced by T-helper cells.
 Lymphokines: produced by lymphocytes
 Monokines: produced exclusively by monocytes
 Interferons: involved in antiviral responses
 Colony stimulating factors: support the growth of cells in semisolid media
 Chemokines: mediate chemoattraction (chemotaxis) between cells.

Classification

Structural 
Structural homogeneity has been able to partially distinguish between cytokines that do not demonstrate a considerable degree of redundancy so that they can be classified into four types:

The four-α-helix bundle family: member cytokines have three-dimensional structures with a bundle of four α-helices. This family, in turn, is divided into three sub-families:
 the IL-2 subfamily. This is the largest family. It contains several non-immunological cytokines including erythropoietin (EPO) and thrombopoietin (TPO). They can be grouped into long-chain and short-chain cytokines by topology. Some members share the common gamma chain as part of their receptor.
 the interferon (IFN) subfamily.
 the IL-10 subfamily.
The IL-1 family, which primarily includes IL-1 and IL-18.
 The cysteine knot cytokines include members of the transforming growth factor beta superfamily, including TGF-β1, TGF-β2 and TGF-β3.
 The IL-17 family, which has yet to be completely characterized, though member cytokines have a specific effect in promoting proliferation of T-cells that cause cytotoxic effects.

Functional 
A classification that proves more useful in clinical and experimental practice outside of structural biology divides immunological cytokines into those that enhance cellular immune responses, type 1 (TNFα, IFN-γ, etc.), and those that enhance antibody responses, type 2 (TGF-β, IL-4, IL-10, IL-13, etc.). A key focus of interest has been that cytokines in one of these two sub-sets tend to inhibit the effects of those in the other. Dysregulation of this tendency is under intensive study for its possible role in the pathogenesis of autoimmune disorders. Several inflammatory cytokines are induced by oxidative stress. The fact that cytokines themselves trigger the release of other cytokines  and also lead to increased oxidative stress makes them important in chronic inflammation, as well as other immunoresponses, such as fever and acute phase proteins of the liver (IL-1,6,12, IFN-a). Cytokines also play a role in anti-inflammatory pathways and are a possible therapeutic treatment for pathological pain from inflammation or peripheral nerve injury. There are both pro-inflammatory and  anti-inflammatory cytokines that regulate this pathway.

Receptors 

In recent years, the cytokine receptors have come to demand the attention of more investigators than cytokines themselves, partly because of their remarkable characteristics and partly because a deficiency of cytokine receptors has now been directly linked to certain debilitating immunodeficiency states. In this regard, and also because the redundancy and pleomorphism of cytokines are, in fact, a consequence of their homologous receptors, many authorities think that a classification of cytokine receptors would be more clinically and experimentally useful.

A classification of cytokine receptors based on their three-dimensional structure has, therefore, been attempted. Such a classification, though seemingly cumbersome, provides several unique perspectives for attractive pharmacotherapeutic targets.

 Immunoglobulin (Ig) superfamily, which are ubiquitously present throughout several cells and tissues of the vertebrate body, and share structural homology with immunoglobulins (antibodies), cell adhesion molecules, and even some cytokines. Examples: IL-1 receptor types.
 Hemopoietic Growth Factor (type 1) family, whose members have certain conserved motifs in their extracellular amino-acid domain. The IL-2 receptor belongs to this chain, whose γ-chain (common to several other cytokines) deficiency is directly responsible for the x-linked form of Severe Combined Immunodeficiency (X-SCID).
 Interferon (type 2) family, whose members are receptors for IFN β and γ.
 Tumor necrosis factors (TNF) (type 3) family, whose members share a cysteine-rich common extracellular binding domain, and includes several other non-cytokine ligands like CD40, CD27 and CD30, besides the ligands on which the family is named.
 Seven transmembrane helix family, the ubiquitous receptor type of the animal kingdom. All G protein-coupled receptors (for hormones and neurotransmitters) belong to this family. Chemokine receptors, two of which act as binding proteins for HIV (CD4 and CCR5), also belong to this family.
 Interleukin-17 receptor (IL-17R) family, which shows little homology with any other cytokine receptor family. Structural motifs conserved between members of this family include: an extracellular fibronectin III-like domain, a transmembrane domain and a cytoplasmic SERIF domain. The known members of this family are as follows: IL-17RA, IL-17RB, IL-17RC, IL17RD and IL-17RE.

Cellular effects 
Each cytokine has a matching cell-surface receptor. Subsequent cascades of intracellular signaling then alter cell functions. This may include the upregulation and/or downregulation of several genes and their transcription factors, resulting in the production of other cytokines, an increase in the number of surface receptors for other molecules, or the suppression of their own effect by feedback inhibition. The effect of a particular cytokine on a given cell depends on the cytokine, its extracellular abundance, the presence and abundance of the complementary receptor on the cell surface, and downstream signals activated by receptor binding; these last two factors can vary by cell type. Cytokines are characterized by considerable redundancy, in that many cytokines appear to share similar functions. It seems to be a paradox that cytokines binding to antibodies have a stronger immune effect than the cytokine alone. This may lead to lower therapeutic doses.

It has been shown that inflammatory cytokines cause an IL-10-dependent inhibition of T-cell expansion and function by up-regulating PD-1 levels on monocytes, which leads to IL-10 production by monocytes after binding of PD-1 by PD-L. Adverse reactions to cytokines are characterized by local inflammation and/or ulceration at the injection sites. Occasionally such reactions are seen with more widespread papular eruptions.

Roles in health and disease
Cytokines are involved in several developmental processes during embryonic development. Cytokines are released from the blastocyst, and are also expressed in the endometrium, and have critical roles in the stages of zona hatching, and implantation. Cytokines are crucial for fighting off infections and in other immune responses. However, they can become dysregulated and pathological in inflammation, trauma, sepsis, and hemorrhagic stroke. Dysregulated cytokine secretion in the aged population can lead to inflammaging, and render these individuals more vulnerable to age-related diseases like neurodegenerative diseases and type 2 diabetes.

Adverse effects

Adverse effects of cytokines have been linked to many disease states and conditions ranging from schizophrenia, major depression and Alzheimer's disease to cancer. T regulatory cells (Tregs) and related-cytokines are effectively engaged in the process of tumor immune escape and functionally inhibit immune response against the tumor. Forkhead box protein 3 (Foxp3) as a transcription factor is an essential molecular marker of Treg cells. Foxp3 polymorphism (rs3761548) might be involved in cancer progression like gastric cancer through influencing Tregs function and the secretion of immunomodulatory cytokines such as IL-10, IL-35, and TGF-β. 
Normal tissue integrity is preserved by feedback interactions between diverse cell types mediated by adhesion molecules and secreted cytokines; disruption of normal feedback mechanisms in cancer threatens tissue integrity.

Over-secretion of cytokines can trigger a dangerous cytokine storm syndrome. Cytokine storms may have been the cause of severe adverse events during a clinical trial of TGN1412. Cytokine storms are also suspected to be the main cause of death in the 1918 "Spanish Flu" pandemic. Deaths were weighted more heavily towards people with healthy immune systems, because of their ability to produce stronger immune responses, with dramatic increases in cytokine levels. Another example of cytokine storm is seen in acute pancreatitis. Cytokines are integral and implicated in all angles of the cascade, resulting in the systemic inflammatory response syndrome and multi-organ failure associated with this intra-abdominal catastrophe. In the COVID-19 pandemic, some deaths from COVID-19 have been attributable to cytokine release storms. Current data suggest cytokine storms may be the source of extensive lung tissue damage and dysfunctional coagulation in COVID-19 infections.

Medical use as drugs

Some cytokines have been developed into protein therapeutics using recombinant DNA technology. Recombinant cytokines being used as drugs as of 2014 include:
 Bone morphogenetic protein (BMP), used to treat bone-related conditions
 Erythropoietin (EPO), used to treat anemia
 Granulocyte colony-stimulating factor (G-CSF), used to treat neutropenia in cancer patients
 Granulocyte macrophage colony-stimulating factor (GM-CSF), used to treat neutropenia and fungal infections in cancer patients
 Interferon alfa, used to treat hepatitis C and multiple sclerosis
 Interferon beta, used to treat multiple sclerosis
 Interleukin 2 (IL-2), used to treat cancer. 
 Interleukin 11 (IL-11), used to treat thrombocytopenia in cancer patients.
 Interferon gamma is used to treat chronic granulomatous disease and osteopetrosis

See also 

Adipokines
Apoptosis
Cytokine redundancy
Cytokine release syndrome
Cytokine secretion assay
ELISA assays
Myokine
Signal transduction
Thymic stromal lymphopoietin
Virokine

Notes

References

External links

Cytokine Signalling Forum
Cytokine Tutorial
Cytokine Gene Summary, Ontology, Pathways and More: Immunology Database and Analysis Portal (ImmPort)

 

Immunology